Lillian G. Burry is an American politician. A member of the Republican Party, she has served on the Monmouth County Board of County Commissioners since January 2006. She first served as Director of the Board in 2008, the first woman and the first Italian-American to do so in Monmouth County. She was again chosen as Director of the Board in 2011, 2014, and 2017.

Biography
Lillian Beneforti was born in New York City, where she attended the local public schools and, later, Wagner College, where she graduated cum Laude with a double major (Political Science/History). At Wagner she met her future husband, Captain Donald Burry. She worked in the field of real estate as a licensed broker for more than 40 years, starting out when it was unusual for women to work in that field.

Political career
Freeholder Burry was elected to positions at the local level in both Colts Neck and Matawan. In Matawan, she was the first woman elected to the Borough Council. During her tenure she assisted in restoring Borough Hall. The borough received 80 percent of the funding for the project from the U.S. Department of Housing and Urban Development. She participated in the purchase of Matawan's wetlands with 80 percent funding from the state Green Acres Program, and played a leading role in fighting the Imperial Oil Company after the firm was discovered dumping at Burnt Fly Bog. She headed Matawan's Historic Preservation Program, during which time the group purchased and restored the borough's most historic 18th century-era mansion.

In Colts Neck, she was elected to three terms on the Township Committee, where she served as mayor, deputy mayor and committeewoman. She was also actively involved in Colts Neck committees including: Planning Board, Long-Range Planning Committee, Litigation Steering, Architectural Review, Buildings & Grounds, Finance, Affordable Housing, Environmental Commission and the Farmland, Open Space & Historic Preservation Program. She also represented Colts Neck as the municipal liaison to the local schools, regional high school, county government, Naval Weapons Station Earle, Police Department, and the September 11th Memorial Committee. 

Prior to being elected to the Board of County Commissioners, Burry had served as a citizen member of the Monmouth County Planning Board and the Monmouth County Library Commission. Burry was elected to her first three-year term on the Board in the November 2005 general election and was re-elected in 2008, 2010, 2014, 2017, and 2020. Reports have appeared in local news media that she is preparing to run for re-election in 2023.

See also
List of Monmouth County Board of County Commissioner Directors

References

Living people
Mayors of places in New Jersey
County commissioners in New Jersey
New Jersey Republicans
American people of Italian descent
People from Colts Neck Township, New Jersey
People from Matawan, New Jersey
Wagner College alumni
Women mayors of places in New Jersey
Year of birth missing (living people)
21st-century American women